Livezey is a surname. Notable people with the surname include:

 Bradley C. Livezey (1954–2011), American ornithologist
 Jon Harlan Livezey (born 1938), American politician

See also
 Livezey House
 Livesey (surname)